is a Japanese actress, voice actress and narrator from Tokyo. She is affiliated with 81 Produce.

Filmography

Television animation
1970's

The Adventures of Hutch the Honeybee (1974) (Denta)
Wakakusa no Charlotte (1977) (Jim)
Anne of Green Gables (1979) (Laurette Bradley)
Mobile Suit Gundam (Jill Ratokie, Tachi)
Manga Sarutobi Sasuke (Sasuke Sarutobi)

1980's

Ai no Gakko Cuore Monogatari (Antonio)
GoShogun (Kenta Sanada)
Belle and Sebastian (Maria)
Dash Kappei (Todo)
City Hunter 2 (1988) (Keiko Kashiwagi)
Moeru! Oniisan (1988) (Kenji Kokuho)
Madö King Granzört (1989) (Haruka Daiichi)
Jungle Book Shōnen Mowgli (1989) (Akru)

1990's

Future GPX Cyber Formula (1991) (Karl Richter von Randoll)
Kinnikuman: Scramble for the Throne (1991) (Sayuri Kinniku, Konita, Phoenix Shizuko)
Sailor Moon (1992) (ep.5 Iguara)
GeGeGe no Kitaro (fourth series 1996) (Kitarō)
Himitsu no Akko-chan (third series 1998) (Ganmo's Mother)
One Piece (Alvida)

2000's

Gear Fighter Dendoh (Ginga Izumo)
Zoids: Chaotic Century (Mother)
Crush Gear Turbo (Heinrich Gang)
Digimon Tamers (Curly)
Hikaru no Go (Kōsuke Ochi)
Ojamajo Doremi (MajoVanilla)
Ashita no Nadja (2003) (Zabii's mother)
Kaleido Star (2003) (Jerill Robins)
Zatch Bell! (2004) (Pamūn)
My-Otome (2005) (Maria Graceburt)
Kinda'ichi Case Files (2007) (Ikuko Futagami)
Golgo 13 (2008) (Peggy)
Full Metal Alchemist Brotherhood (2009) (Madame Christmas)

2010's

Danchi Tomoo (2013) (Komatsu)
Sailor Moon Crystal (2014) (Queen Metaria)
Spiritpact (2017) (Obaa-sama)

Original video animation
AD Police Files (1990) (Gina Marceau)
Sol Bianca (1990) (Feb Fall)
Tsuki ga Noboru made ni (1991) - Farmer as a young boy
My-Otome 0~S.ifr~ (2008) (Maria Graceburt)

Animated films
Futari wa Pretty Cure Max Heart: The Movie (2005) (Square)

Dubbing roles
The Core (Dr. Talma "Stick" Stickley (Alfre Woodard))
A Dog's Journey (Hannah Montgomery (Marg Helgenberger))
A Dog's Purpose (Adult Hannah (Peggy Lipton))
ER (Dr. Amanda Lee (Mare Winningham))
Legally Blonde (Mrs. Windham-Vandermark (Raquel Welch))
A Little Princess (Amelia (Rusty Schwimmer))
Morning Glory (Colleen Peck (Diane Keaton))
The Soloist (Jennifer (LisaGay Hamilton))
Something's Gotta Give (Erica Barry (Diane Keaton))
Star Trek: Voyager (Kathryn Janeway (Kate Mulgrew))
Twin Peaks (Norma Jennings (Peggy Lipton))

References

External links
Official agency profile 

1954 births
Living people
Japanese stage actresses
Japanese video game actresses
Japanese voice actresses
Voice actresses from Tokyo
81 Produce voice actors